Murphy Guyer (born December 25, 1952) is an American actor, playwright, writer and director, best known for his plays and for appearances in the films The Devil's Advocate (1997), The Jackal (1997), Arthur (2011) and Joker (2019).

Early years
Murphy Guyer was born in Dover, Delaware, and grew up in rural eastern Maryland. He moved to New York City at the age of nineteen to attend the American Academy of Dramatic Arts on an acting scholarship, and soon discovered a talent for writing jokes and comic sketches. He began his professional career writing for various stand-up comics and improv groups.

Career
In the early 1980s, Guyer's first play Eden Court premiered at the Humana Festival of New American Plays in Louisville, Kentucky. The play was later produced on Broadway and made into a film. During the course of his career, Guyer has written works for stage, screen and radio, and tends to farce and satire. His plays have been produced Off-Broadway and at regional theaters in the US, Canada, Ireland, Britain, Europe and Russia. His play The Realists was listed as one of the Best Plays of 1988-1989, and his adaptation of The Emancipation of Valet de Chambre was noted as one of the Best Plays of 1999-2000.
 
In 1991 Guyer began acting in TV and films, with his first appearance as Tommy Gallagher in the Law & Order episode "Heaven." Between 1996 and 2003, Guyer served as Associate Artistic Director for Playwrighting at the Cleveland Play House.

Works
Selected plays include:
Eden Court, produced at Actors Theatre of Louisville, Humana Festival, 1982-1983
The American Century, produced at Actors Theatre of Louisville, Humana Festival, 1984-1985
The American Century, produced at Solar Stage, Toronto, Canada, 1985
The Metaphor, produced at Actors Theatre of Louisville, Humana Festival, 1987-1988
Loyalties, published in 25 Ten-Minute Plays from Actors Theatre of Louisville, 1989, then in 30 Ten-Minute Plays for 4, 5, & 6 Actors from the National Ten-Minute Play Contest, 2001
The Enchanted Maze, produced at Eugene O'Neill Theater Center, Waterford, CT, 1990
Rendezvous with Reality, produced in Philadelphia, PA, 1995
The Interrogation, produced by Subterranean Theatre Company, HydePark Theatre, Austin, TX, 1997
Russian Romance, produced at Cleveland Play House, Drury Theater,Cleveland, OH, 1998
The American Century, produced at Theatre of Western Springs, Western Springs, IL, 2000
World of Mirth, produced at Theater Four, New York City, 2001, 
The Infinite Regress of Human Vanity, produced at Cleveland Play House, 2002

Filmography

Film

Television

Videogames

References

External links

List of works at Filmreference.com

Living people
21st-century American writers
American musical theatre directors
People from Dover, Delaware
American theatre managers and producers
Writers from Delaware
American male actors
1952 births
20th-century American dramatists and playwrights